José Antonio Peral Alonso (born 6 March 1992) is a Spanish footballer. Mainly a right back, he can also play as a winger.

Club career
Born in Elche, Valencian Community, Peral joined Elche CF's youth setup in 2008, after stints at locals Kelme CF and Alicante CF. He made his senior debuts with the reserves in 2012, in Tercera División.

On 30 January 2014 Peral was loaned to Segunda División B's Atlético Sanluqueño CF, until June. He returned to the Franjverdes in June, after appearing in ten matches and scoring one goal – his first as a senior – in a 1–2 away loss against FC Cartagena on 9 March.

On 3 January 2015, Peral was called up by the main squad for a La Liga match against Villarreal CF, but remained unused in the 2–2 draw at the Estadio Martínez Valero. He made his professional debut twelve days later, starting in 0–4 Copa del Rey home loss against FC Barcelona (0–9 on aggregate).

On 3 February 2016, after more than six months without a club, Peral signed for SD Borja also in the fourth level.

References

External links

1992 births
Living people
Footballers from Elche
Spanish footballers
Association football defenders
Association football wingers
Association football utility players
Segunda División B players
Tercera División players
Elche CF Ilicitano footballers
Atlético Sanluqueño CF players
Elche CF players